The Darién Gap is a geographic region in the Isthmus of Darien or Isthmus of Panama connecting the North and South American continents within Central America, consisting of a large watershed, forest, and mountains in Panama's Darién Province and the northern portion of Colombia's Chocó Department.

Road-building through this area is expensive and detrimental to the environment. Political consensus in favor of road construction collapsed after an initial attempt failed in the early 1970s, with a proposal in the early 1990s halted by serious environmental concerns. As of 2023, there was no active plan to build a road through the gap.

The Serranía del Baudó range extends along Colombia's Pacific coast and into Panama.

The Darién Gap is home to the Embera-Wounaan and Guna people and was also home to the Cueva people who became extinct by 1535, following the Spanish invasion of Panama. Travel is often conducted with pirogues. On the Panamanian side, La Palma, the area's cultural center, is the capital of the province. Other population centers include Yaviza and El Real. The Darién Gap had a reported population of 8,000 in 1995 among five tribes. Maize, cassava, plantains, and bananas are staple crops on local farms.

Pan-American Highway

On the South American side, the Highway terminates at Turbo, Colombia, near .

Efforts were made for decades to fill this sole gap in the Pan-American Highway. Planning began in 1971 with the help of American funding, but was halted in 1974 after concerns were raised by environmentalists. US support was further blocked by the US Department of Agriculture in 1978, from its desire to stop the spread of foot-and-mouth disease. Another effort to build the road began in 1992, but by 1994 a United Nations agency reported that the road, and the subsequent development, would cause extensive environmental damage. Cited reasons include evidence that the Darién Gap has prevented the spread of diseased cattle into Central and North America, which have not seen foot-and-mouth disease since 1954, and since at least the 1970s this has been a substantial factor in preventing a road link through the Darién Gap. The Embera-Wounaan and Guna are among five tribes, comprising 8,000 people, who have expressed concern that the road would bring about the potential erosion of their cultures by destroying their food sources.

Many people, including local indigenous populations, groups and governments are opposed to completing the Darién portion of the highway. Reasons for opposition include protecting the rainforest, containing the spread of tropical diseases, protecting the livelihood of indigenous peoples in the area, preventing drug trafficking and its associated violence, and preventing foot-and-mouth disease from entering North America. The extension of the highway as far as Yaviza resulted in severe deforestation alongside the highway route within a decade.

An alternative to the Darien Gap highway would be a river ferry service between Turbo or Necoclí, Colombia and one of several sites along Panama's Caribbean coast. "At the moment it's a good option," said Juan Pablo Ruiz, director of Colombian environmental organization Ecofondo, in 1995. "We see how England has been connected with Europe for years with a ferry."  Ferry services such as Crucero Express and Ferry Xpress operated to link the gap, but closed because the service was not profitable.  As of 2023, nothing has come of this idea.

Another idea is to use a combination of bridges and tunnels to avoid the environmentally sensitive regions. This is a futuristic concept, not a plan.

History

Pre-Columbian history 

Archaeological knowledge of this area has received relatively little attention compared to its neighbors to the north and south, although in the early 20th century scholars such as Max Uhle, William Henry Holmes, C. V. Hartman and George Grant MacCurdy undertook studies of archaeological sites and collections that were augmented by further research by Samuel Kirkland Lothrop, John Alden Mason, Doris Zemurray Stone, William Duncan Strong, Gordon Willey and others. One of the reasons for the relative lack of attention is the lack of research into this by people of the region. There are a large number of sites with impressive platform mounds, plazas, paved roads, stone sculpture and artifacts made from jade, gold and ceramic materials.

The Guna people lived in what is now Northern Colombia and the Darién Province of Panama at the time of the Spanish conquest and subsequently began to move westward due to a conflict with the Spanish and other indigenous groups. Centuries before the conquest, the Gunas arrived in South America as part of a Chibchan migration moving east from Central America. At the time of the Spanish invasion, they were living in the region of Uraba near the borders of what are now Antioquia and Caldas. The Guna themselves attribute their several migrations to conflicts with other chiefdoms, and their migration to nearby islands in particular to escape malarial mosquito populations on the mainland.

European settlement 

Vasco Núñez de Balboa and Alonso de Ojeda explored the coast of Colombia in 1500 and 1501. They spent the most time in the Gulf of Urabá, where they made contact with the Gunas. The regional border was initially created in 1508 after royal decree to separate the colonial governorships of Castilla de Oro and Nueva Andalucía, using the River Atrato as the boundary between the two governorships.

Balboa heard of the "South Sea" from locals while sailing along the Caribbean coast. On 25 September 1513, he saw the Pacific.

In 1519, the town of Panamá was founded near a small indigenous settlement on the Pacific coast. After the Spaniards entered what is now Peru, it developed into an important transshipment port as well as an administrative center.

In 1671, the Welsh pirate Henry Morgan crossed the Isthmus of Panamá from the Caribbean side and destroyed the city; the town was subsequently relocated a few kilometers to the west on a small peninsula. The ruins of the old town, Panamá Viejo, are preserved and were declared a UNESCO World Heritage Site in 1997.

Silver and gold from the viceroyalty of Peru stolen from indigenous communities was taken across the isthmus by Spanish Silver Train to Porto Bello, where Spanish treasure fleets shipped them to Seville and Cádiz from 1707. Lionel Wafer spent four years between 1680 and 1684 among the Gunas.

In 1698 the Kingdom of Scotland tried to establish a settlement in a project known as the Darien scheme, intending to tame, occupy and administer the untraversable land of the Darién Gap, and use it as a gateway to trade between the Atlantic and Pacific oceans, as was later achieved successfully by the Panama Railroad and then the Panama Canal. The first expedition of five ships (Saint Andrew, Caledonia, Unicorn, Dolphin and Endeavour) set sail from Leith on 14 July 1698, with around 1,200 people on board. Their orders were "to proceed to the Bay of Darien, and make the Isle called the Golden Island ... some few leagues to the leeward of the mouth of the great River of Darien ... and there make a settlement on the mainland". After calling at Madeira and the West Indies, the fleet made landfall off the coast of Darien on 2 November. The settlers christened their new home "New Caledonia".

The aim was for the colony to have an overland route that connected the Pacific and Atlantic oceans. Since its inception, it has been said that the undertaking was beset by poor planning and provisioning, divided leadership, a poor choice of trade goods, devastating epidemics of disease, reported attempts by the East India Company to frustrate it, and a failure to anticipate the Spanish Empire's military response. It was finally abandoned in March 1700 after a siege and harbor blockade by Spanish forces.

As the Company of Scotland was backed by approximately 20% of all the money circulating in Scotland, its failure left the Scottish Lowlands in substantial financial ruin; in fact, English financial incentives are thought to have been a factor in persuading those in power to support the 1707 union with England. According to this argument, the Scottish establishment of landed aristocracy and mercantile elites considered that their best chance of being part of a major power would be to share the benefits of England's international trade and the growth of the English overseas possessions, so its future would have to lie in unity with England. Furthermore, Scotland's nobles were almost bankrupted by the Darien fiasco.

Panamanian independence

Most of Panama was part of Colombia until it declared its independence in 1903, with encouragement and support from the United States. The geography of Darién, through which no troops could pass, made its Departamento of Panamá harder to defend and control.

This treaty is officially registered in the Register No. 814 of the Treaty League of Nations, on 17 August 1925; said border was based on the same Colombian law of 9 June 1855.

Natural resources

Two major national parks exist in the Darién Gap: Darién National Park in Panama and Los Katíos National Park in Colombia. The Darién Gap forests had extensive cedrela and mahogany cover until many of these trees were removed by loggers.

The property includes a stretch of the Pacific Coast and almost the entire border with neighbouring Colombia.

Copa Airlines Flight 201
On 6 June 1992, Copa Airlines Flight 201, a Boeing 737 jet airplane covering a flight between Panama City and Cali, Colombia, crashed in the Darién Gap, killing all 47 people on board.

Adventure travelers
To travel between the continents through the Darién Gap has long been a challenge for adventure travelers.

The Gap can be transited by off-road vehicles attempting intercontinental journeys. The first post-colonial expedition to the Darién was the Marsh Darien Expedition in 1924–25, supported by several major sponsors, including the Smithsonian Institution, the American Museum of Natural History and the government of Panama.

The first vehicular crossing of the Gap was made by three Brazilians in two Ford Model T cars. They left Rio de Janeiro in 1928 and arrived in the United States in 1938. The expedition intended to bring attention for the Panamerican highway, after an International Conference in Chile, in 1923. The participants were Leonidas Borges de Oliveira, a lieutenant from Brazilian army, Francisco Lopez da Cruz from Brazilian air force, and Mário Fava, a young mechanic. They took what appears to be the last photo of Augusto Sandino, who received them in Nicaragua, and were received by Henry Ford and Franklin Roosevelt in the United States. Their story is available with photos from the book O Brasil através das três Américas (Brazil Across the Three Americas) written by Beto Braga.

Another crossing was completed by the Land Rover La Cucaracha Cariñosa (The Affectionate Cockroach) and a Jeep of the Trans-Darién Expedition of 1959–60, crewed by Amado Araúz (Panama), his wife Reina Torres de Araúz, former Special Air Service man Richard E. Bevir (UK) and engineer Terence John Whitfield (Australia). They traveled a great deal of the distance up the vast Atrato River.

In December 1960, on a motorcycle trip from Alaska to Argentina, adventurer Danny Liska attempted to transit the Darién Gap from Panama to Colombia. Liska was forced to abandon his motorcycle and proceed across the Gap by boat and foot. In 1961, a team of three 1961 Chevrolet Corvairs and several support vehicles departed from Panama. The group was sponsored by Dick Doane Chevrolet (a Chicago Chevrolet dealer) and the Chevrolet division of General Motors. After 109 days, they reached the Colombia Border with two Corvairs, the third having been abandoned in the jungle. It has been documented by a Jam Handy Productions film along with an article in Automobile Quarterly magazine (Volume 1 number 3, from the fall of 1962).

A pair of Range Rovers was used on the British Trans-Americas Expedition in 1972 led by John Blashford-Snell, which is claimed to be the first vehicle-based expedition to traverse both American continents north to south through the Darién Gap. The Expedition crossed the Atrato Swamp in Colombia with the cars on special inflatable rafts that were carried in the backs of the vehicles. However, they received substantial support from the British Army. Blashford-Snell's book, Something Lost Behind the Ranges (Harper Collins), has several chapters on the Darién expedition. The Hundred Days of Darien, a book written by Russell Braddon in 1974, also chronicles this expedition. In addition to the book, a video exists that was filmed by two Vancouver, BC–based cameramen, Alan Bibby and Eric Rankin. These cameramen were mentioned in the book several times and can be seen in some of the still photos in the book.

The first fully overland wheeled crossing (others used boats for some sections) of the Gap was that of British cyclist Ian Hibell, who rode from Cape Horn to Alaska between 1971 and 1973. Hibell took the "direct" overland south-to-north route, including an overland crossing of the Atrato Swamp in Colombia. Hibell completed his crossing of the Gap accompanied by two New Zealand cycling companions who had ridden with him from Cape Horn, but neither of these continued with Hibell to Alaska.

The first motorcycle crossing was by Robert L. Webb in March 1975. Another four-wheel drive crossing was in 1978–1979 by Mark A. Smith and his team. They drove the  stretch of the gap in 30 days using five stock Jeep CJ-7s, traveling many kilometres up the Atrato River on barges.

The first all-land auto crossing was in 1985–1987 by Loren Upton and Patty Mercier in a CJ-5 Jeep, taking  days to travel . This crossing is documented in the 1992 Guinness Book of Records. Ed Culberson was the first one to follow the entire Pan-American highway including the Darién Gap proposed route on a motorcycle, a BMW R80G/S. From Yaviza, he first followed the Loren Upton team but went solo just before Pucuru, hiring his own guides.

In the 1990s, the gap was briefly joined by ferry service, provided by Crucero Express, until it ceased operations in 1997.

A number of notable crossings have been made on foot. Sebastian Snow crossed the Gap with Wade Davis in 1975 as part of his unbroken walk from Tierra del Fuego to Costa Rica. The trip is documented in his 1976 book The Rucksack Man and in Wade Davis's 1996 book One River. In 1981, George Meegan crossed the gap on a similar journey. He too started in Tierra del Fuego and eventually ended in Alaska. His 1988 biography, The Longest Walk, describes the trip and includes a 25-page chapter on his foray through the Gap. In 2001, as a part of his Goliath Expedition—a trek to forge an unbroken footpath from the tip of South America to the Bering Strait and back to his home in England—Karl Bushby (UK) crossed the gap on foot, using no transport or boats, from Colombia to Panama.

In July 1996, as part of their hitchhiking trip to Ushuaia through 17 Latin American countries, Walter Bläs, Ana Cravioto, Albrecht von der Recke and Gustavo Ross crossed from Panama to Colombia, becoming the first Mexicans to cross the Gap on foot, according to the visitors log kept since 1946 in Púcuro. The night of 28 July, they survived the Hurricane Cesar–Douglas in the jungle somewhere between Paya and Palo de las Letras. Accompanied by 11- and 13-year-old Lico and Juan from Paya, the survivors reported several big trees falling around them and river levels rising up to 3 meters (10 feet) that night.

In 1979, evangelist Arthur Blessitt traversed the gap while carrying a  wooden cross, a trek confirmed by Guinness World Records as part of "the longest round the world pilgrimage" for Christ. Traveling alone with a machete plus one backpack crammed with water bottles, a hammock, Bible, notepad, lemon drops and Blessitt's signature Jesus stickers saying "Smile! God Loves you", Blessitt describes his experience in a book, The Cross, and in a full-length movie with the same title.

Most crossings of the Darién Gap region have been from Panama to Colombia. In July 1961, three college students — Carl Adler, James Wirth, and Joseph Bellina — crossed from the Bay of San Miguel to Puerto Obaldia on the Gulf of Parita (near Colombia) and ultimately to Mulatupu in the San Blas Islands. The trip across the Darién was by banana boat, piragua and foot via the Tuira river (La Palma and El Real de Santa Maria), Río Chucunaque (Yaviza), Rio Tuquesa (Chaua's (General Choco Chief) Trading Post—Choco Indian village) and Serranía del Darién.

In 1985, Project Raleigh, which evolved from Project Drake in 1984 and in 1989 became Raleigh International, sponsored an expedition which also crossed the Darién coast to coast. Their path was similar to the 1961 route above, but in reverse. The expedition started in the Bay of Caledonia at the Serranía del Darién, following the Río Membrillo ultimately to the Río Chucunaque and Yaviza, roughly following the route taken by Balboa in 1513.

Between the early 1980s and mid-1990s, Encounter Overland, a British adventure travel company, organized 2- to 3-week trekking trips through the Darién Gap from Panama to Colombia or vice versa. These trips used a combination of whatever transport was available: jeeps, bus, boats, and walking, with travelers carrying their own supplies. Experienced trekkers guided mixed-sex groups of any nationality. One individual led nine Darién Gap trips and later acted as a logistics guide and coordinator for the BBC Natural History Unit during the production of a documentary called A Tramp in the Darien, which screened on BBC in 1990–1991.

Complete overland crossings of the Darién rainforest on foot and riverboat (i.e., from the last road in Panama to the first road in Colombia) became more dangerous in the 1990s because of the Colombian conflict. The Colombian portion of the Darién rainforest in the Katios Park region eventually fell under control of armed groups. Furthermore, combatants from Colombia even entered Panama, occupied some Panamanian jungle villages and kidnapped or killed inhabitants and travelers.

In 2017 a group of four retired US soldiers — Wayne Mitchell, Simon Edwards, Rich Doering, and Mike Eastham — led by Kuna guide Isaac Pizarro and assisted by villagers from the Kuna village of Paya, crossed the Darien in 8 days with four Kawasaki KLR motorcycles.  The group was accompanied by filmmaker Jake Hamby and photographer Alex Manne, who documented the entire motorcycle trip from Alaska to Argentina in the 2022 documentary film "Where the Road Ends" on Youtube.

Migrants traveling northward
While the Darién Gap has been considered to be essentially impassable, in the 2010s thousands of migrants, primarily Haitian—and in the 2020s, thousands of Venezuelans—crossed the Darién Gap to reach the United States. By 2021 the number was more than 130,000. The hike is demanding and dangerous, with rape and robbery common, and there are numerous fatalities.

By 2013 the coastal route on the east side of the Darién Isthmus became relatively safe, by taking a motorboat across the Gulf of Uraba from Turbo to Capurganá and then hopping the coast to Sapzurro and hiking from there to La Miel, Panama. All inland routes through the Darién remain highly dangerous. In June 2017, CBS journalist Adam Yamaguchi filmed smugglers leading refugees on a nine-day journey from Colombia to Panama through the Darién.

Migrants from Africa, South Asia, the Middle East and the Caribbean have been known to cross the Darién Gap as a method of migrating to the United States. This route may entail flying to Ecuador (taking advantage of that nation's liberal visa policy) and attempting to cross the gap on foot. The journalist Jason Motlagh was interviewed by Sacha Pfeiffer on NPR's nationally syndicated radio show On Point in 2016 concerning his work following migrants through the Darién Gap. Journalists Nadja Drost and Bruno Federico were interviewed by Nick Schifrin about their work following migrants through the Darién Gap in mid-2019 and the effects of the COVID-19 pandemic a year later, as part of a series on migration to the United States for PBS NewsHour. In 2023 significant numbers of people fleeing the repressive government of China travelled to Ecuador, then to  Necoclí in Colombia, with the intention of crossing the Gap on foot.

The route in the 21st century
Several video teams have traveled with migrants and thus the conditions of the route have become better known. It is possible to hike from Colombia to Panama.

By boat
At various times scheduled boats, including sailboats, have sailed between Cartagena, Turbo, Necoclî and Capurganá, Colombia, and El Porvenir or Colón, Panama. Chartering a small boat is also an option. Sea conditions make it a sometimes hazardous trip, and schedules can change frequently. Any of these options are more expensive than flying.

By land
It is possible to cross the Gap on foot, but the conditions are very difficult and often underestimated. It is one of the rainiest and most dangerous places on the planet, a lawless, unpoliced region, with many drug smugglers and sometimes political rebels. Records are not kept, but it is known that many migrants die on this trip.

The hiking trail ascends abruptly over a mountain; the four-day hike is a challenge even for a person in good physical shape with good shoes. Most migrants are in mediocre physical shape or worse, and without equipment for hiking and camping. Women who are carrying babies or pregnant make the attempt. Three migrant women bore babies in the Darién between 2013 and 2021, with no medical help or supplies available.

The Darién Gap is one of the rainiest places on the planet. The rainfall produces flash floods that can carry sleepers to their deaths. Several rivers with neither bridges nor boats must be crossed. No services of any kind are available; food, a tent and water purification materials sufficient for a hike of several days must be carried. Bodies of dead migrants are often found, dead because  too exhausted to continue, or with problems such as blisters that require treatment. There is no medical help and no way to evacuate someone ill, injured, or simply exhausted. A broken leg is usually fatal. There are many insects, snakes, and carnivorous animals. Many migrants are robbed or raped. There is no police presence and no cell phone signal.

In Capurganá, Colombia, and Yaviza, Panama, many young men offer, for a fee, to serve as guides and to provide "protection". There is no easy way to determine if those who offer these services are knowledgeable or trustworthy, or criminals looking for victims.

Armed conflict

The Darién Gap was subject to the Marxist Revolutionary Armed Forces of Colombia (FARC), which led an insurgency against the Colombian government. FARC rebels were present on both the Colombian and Panamanian sides of the border.

In 2000, two British travelers, Tom Hart Dyke and Paul Winder, were kidnapped by FARC in the Darién Gap while hunting for exotic orchids; they were held captive for nine months and threatened with death before eventually being released unharmed and without a ransom being paid. Dyke and Winder later documented their experience in the book The Cloud Garden and in an episode of Locked Up Abroad.

Other non-political victims include three New Tribes missionaries, who died after disappearing from the Panamanian side in 1993.

In 2003, Robert Young Pelton, on assignment for National Geographic Adventure magazine, and two traveling companions, Mark Wedeven and Megan Smaker, were detained for a week by the United Self-Defense Forces of Colombia, a far-right paramilitary organization, in a highly publicized incident.

In May 2013, Swedish backpacker Jan Philip Braunisch disappeared in the area after leaving the Colombian town of Riosucio to attempt crossing on foot to Panama via the Cuenca Cacarica. The FARC admitted to killing him, having mistaken him for a foreign spy.

Videos

See also

 Darien scheme
 Derienni
 Gulf of Darién
 Lionel Wafer

References

Further reading
 
 
 Thomson, Keith (10 May 2022). "Born to be Hanged: The Epic Story of the Gentlemen Pirates Who Raided the South Seas, Rescued a Princess and the Man Who Brought Them Down". Little, Brown and Company.

External links

 "Pan-American Highway and the Environment"
 "A State of Nature: Life, Death, and Tourism in the Darién Gap", 2013
 Why The Pan American Highway Was Never Completed (YouTube Video)
 

Wetlands of Panama
Wetlands of Colombia
Darién Province
Chocó Department
Road-inaccessible communities of North America
Proposed transcontinental crossings
Colombia–Panama border
Colombia–Panama border crossings